Lithuanian Paralympic Committee was founded on 1990 and recognized by the International Paralympic Committee after one year.

Presidents 
 Jonas Mačiukevičius – 1990-1992
 Vytautas Kvietkauskas – 1992-2005
 Vytautas Girnius – 2005–2009
 Vytautas Kvietkauskas - 2009-2017
 Mindaugas Bilius - since 2017

References

External links
 Homepage

National Paralympic Committees
Paralympic
Lithuania at the Paralympics
Sports organizations established in 1990
Organizations based in Vilnius
1990 establishments in Lithuania
Disability organizations based in Lithuania